Zippyshare, also capitalized ZippyShare, is a free file-sharing website.

Features
Zippyshare allows users to upload an unlimited amount of files with a size of up to 500MB each. No account registration is required to upload or download files, and there is no limitation on the number of times a file can be downloaded. However, files are deleted if 30 days pass without them receiving any downloads.

History

Zippyshare was founded in 2006. Zippyshare is noted by TorrentFreak to have outlived many similar websites, such as RapidShare, Hotfile, and Megaupload.

Zippyshare was listed as a notorious market by the Office of the United States Trade Representative in 2015, with the report writing that Zippyshare is "well-known for downloads and distribution of allegedly infringing music" and warning that the website has been known to install malware on users' computers. Zippyshare was also noted in the Recording Industry Association of America's report to the Office of the United States Trade Representative in 2018, with the RIAA recommending Zippyshare be listed as a notorious market in that year as well, writing particularly that while the website respects takedown notices, there is no mechanic to prevent re-uploads of infringing content.

In March 2019, access to Zippyshare was blocked for visitors in the United Kingdom, with a HTTP 403 error message displayed. No reason was given for the block, and it is unclear why Zippyshare decided to block users from the UK. Zippyshare became similarly unavailable in Germany in April 2019 and in Spain in June 2019, also with no explanation.

On March 19, 2023, the site administration wrote a post on the blog explaining that the site was going offline by the end of the month. The administration claimed that they could no longer maintain the site. They also cited decreased activity, higher energy bills and ad blockers.

Reception
Writing for TechRadar in April 2020, reviewer Mayank Sharma gave Zippyshare a 2/5 rating. Sharma wrote that the lack of an ad-free option and privacy settings for uploaded restricts Zippyshare to being useful mainly for sharing unimportant files which are too large to be attached to an email, unlike other file-sharing sites which can be used for file synchronization between various devices. Sharma also criticizes the site's ads as being a "major turn-off", especially since there is no paid option to remove them, and points out that the site includes pop-up ads.

References

External links

One-click hosting
Notorious markets